Sir John Newport, 1st Baronet (24 October 1756 – 9 February 1843) was an Anglo-Irish Whig politician who served as Chancellor of the Exchequer of Ireland.

Life
Born on 24 October 1756, he was the son of Simon Newport, a banker at Waterford, by his wife, Elizabeth, daughter of William Riall of Clonmel. After receiving his education at Eton College and Trinity College, Dublin, he became a partner in his father's bank. He took part in the convention of volunteer delegates which met in Dublin under the presidency of James Caulfeild, 1st Earl of Charlemont in November 1783, and was appointed a member of the committee of inquiry into the state of the borough representation in Ireland.

Newport was created a baronet on 25 August 1789, with remainder to his brother, William Newport. At the general election, in July 1802, he unsuccessfully contested the city of Waterford in the Whig interest against William Congreve Alcock. Newport, however, obtained the seat on petition in December 1803,
and continued to represent Waterford until his retirement from parliamentary life at the dissolution in December 1832.
On the formation of the Ministry of All the Talents, Newport was appointed Chancellor of the Irish exchequer (25 February 1806), and was sworn a member of the English privy council on 12 March 1806. He brought in his first Irish budget on 7 May 1806. In November of this year he was returned for St Mawes, as well as for the city of Waterford, but chose to sit for Waterford. He brought in his second budget on 25 March 1807, and shortly afterwards resigned office with the rest of his colleagues. Newport was created a D.C.L. of the University of Oxford on 3 July 1810.

Newport did not accept office in Lord Liverpool's administration, because the government was averse to measures of Catholic emancipation.

He was a leading critic of the Earl of Elgin's removal of the Elgin Marbles from Athens, commenting that "The Honourable Lord has taken advantage of the most unjustifiable means and has committed the most flagrant pillages. It was, it seems, fatal that a representative of our country loots those objects that the Turks and other barbarians had considered sacred".

He spoke for the last time in the House of Commons on 25 June 1832, during the debate in committee on the Parliamentary Reform Bill for Ireland. On 11 October 1834 he was appointed Comptroller General of the Exchequer, a new office. He retired in 1839, with a pension, and died at Newpark, near Waterford, on 9 Feb. 1843. He was buried in Waterford Cathedral on 15 February following. His tenacity with inquiries in the House of Commons earned him the nickname of the "Political Ferret".

Works
Newport was the author of The State of the Borough Representation of Ireland in 1783 and 1800, London, 1832.

Family
Newport married Ellen, third daughter of Shapland Carew of Castle Boro, M.P. for Waterford city, by whom he had no issue. He was succeeded in the baronetcy by his nephew, the Rev. John Newport, on whose death, on 15 February 1859, the baronetcy became extinct.

Notes

Attribution

External links 
 

1756 births
1843 deaths
People educated at Eton College
Alumni of Trinity College Dublin
19th-century Anglo-Irish people
Irish bankers
People from Waterford (city)
Members of the Parliament of the United Kingdom for County Waterford constituencies (1801–1922)
UK MPs 1802–1806
UK MPs 1806–1807
UK MPs 1807–1812
UK MPs 1812–1818
UK MPs 1818–1820
UK MPs 1820–1826
UK MPs 1826–1830
UK MPs 1830–1831
UK MPs 1831–1832
Baronets in the Baronetage of Ireland
Whig (British political party) MPs for Irish constituencies
Chancellors of the Exchequer of Ireland
Commissioners of the Treasury for Ireland
Comptrollers General of the Exchequer